Greptar (Bengali: গ্রেপ্তার) (English: Arrest) is a 2007 Bengali film directed by Swapan Saha and produced by Rashika Chatterjee under the banner of Maa Karunamoyee Films. The film features actors Prosenjit Chatterjee, Swastika Mukherjee, Tapas Paul, Ashish Vidyarthi and Locket Chatterjee in the lead roles. The music was composed by Anupam Dutta.

Plot
Arun Roy (Prosenjit Chatterjee), a police sub-inspector stopped the car of Indrajit a political leader and brother to the Superintendent of Police, Balaram Babu. Arun Roy was suspended from his job due to the incident. Indrajit, Balaram Babu, and their younger brother, Arjun, maintain informal control over the area. Arun Roy's father, Bhabani Roy, was a police constable who also was suspended from his job for exposing Balaram. Arun Roy fell in love with a college student named Trisha Wesmen, whose father was a journalist. To take revenge for his father's insult, Arun Roy made a plan with his friend Hitler to stage Balaram as madman. They were successful, and Balaram was suspended. A new Superintendent of Police, Sukhomoy, took charge and supported Arun Roy. Indrajit, Arjun, and Balaram tried several times to stop Arun Roy in preventing their different illegal business and failed due to support from the state ministry. Arun later arrested the three of them for different crimes.

Cast
 Prosenjit Chatterjee - Arun Roy (Police officer  sub-inspector)
 Swastika Mukherjee - Trisha (Arun's girl friend)
 Ashish Vidyarthi - Balaram Ghosh,Elder brother of Indrajit (Police officer/SP)
  Subhasish Mukherjee  - Hitler (Arun's friend)
 Bodhisattwa Majumdar - Bhabani Roy (Father of Arun)
 Sudip Mukherjee - Indrajit Ghosh (Political leader)
 Shankar Chakraborty - Arjun Ghosh, younger brother of Indrajit
 Locket Chatterjee - Sonali (Sister of Arun)
 Sumit Gangopadhyay - Bablu (A goon)

Soundtrack 
"E Moner Asha Balobasha" (male) - Abhjeet Bhattacharya
"E Moner Asha Bhalobasha" (duet) - Abhijeet Bhattacharya, Shreya Ghoshal 
"Lal Apple" - N/A
"Vande Mataram" - Shaan

References

Bengali-language Indian films
2007 films
2000s Bengali-language films
Indian action drama films
Films about police officers
Films scored by Anupam Dutta
2000s action drama films
Law enforcement in India
2000s masala films